Darrell Babidge is an English operatic baritone and a professor at The Juilliard School along with William Burden, Elizabeth Bishop, Cynthia Hoffmann, Marlena Malas, Robert White Jr., and Edith Wiens.

He holds a degree from the Royal Northern College of Music and a master's degree from BYU. He also holds a professional degree in vocal performance from the Manhattan School of Music.

Babidge has performed with the Chattanooga Symphony and Opera, Intermountain Opera and the Utah Festival Opera. He also performed with the Mormon Tabernacle Choir in their production of The Redeemer. He played the role of Joseph Smith in BYU's November 2005 performance of Murray Boren's opera The Book of Gold.

Among those who have studied under Babidge are Rachel Willis-Sørensen and Ginger Costa-Jackson.

Babidge is married to Jennifer Welch-Babidge.

Sources
bio from Babidge studios
BYU College of Fine Arts and Communications bio
BYU News article mentioning Babidge performing in "The Book of Gold"
bio connected with "Book of Gold" promotion
mention of Babidge performing in the Salt Lake Choral Artists database of articles on performances
Deseret News, October 28, 2005
article on the Utah Festival Opera mentioning Babidge
Jan. 17, 2009 Mormon Times article on Mormon opera, mention to Babibde early in the article

English Latter Day Saints
English emigrants to the United States
Brigham Young University alumni
Manhattan School of Music alumni
Brigham Young University faculty
Living people
English operatic baritones
Alumni of the Royal Northern College of Music
Year of birth missing (living people)
21st-century English singers
21st-century British opera singers
21st-century British male singers